The 2016 Myanmar National League, also known as the 2016 Ooredoo Myanmar National League, was the 7th season of the Myanmar National League, the top Burmese professional league for association football clubs since its founding in 2009.The transfer period for the 2016 season was from 1 November 2015 to 8 January 2016.

Yangon United began the season as defending champions of the 2015 Myanmar National League. Southern Myanmar and Horizon entered as the two promoted teams from the 2015 Myanmar National League 2. Horizon FC was promoted to the MNL for the first time.

The first half of the 2016 Ooredoo MNL was completely finished on 4 April, and the second half started on May 21. The half-season transfer window was opened from April 18 to May 17. After Week 12, the remaining matches were suspended for three weeks because of the Myanmar national football team's participation in the 2016 AYA Bank Cup. The matches resumed on 11 June from Week 13.

First half-season review
At the half-season break, Yadanarbon led the 2016 MNL Ooredoo standing table with 29 points, followed by Hanthawaddy United with 21 points. The 2015 General Aung San Shield winners Ayeyawady United stood third with 20 points. Reigning MNL champions Yangon United only earned 19 points and grabbed the fourth place.

Events

This season was the second Myanmar National League season to have had Ooredoo as the title sponsor, after the MFF and the Qatar-based telecom operator signed a US$1 million-a-year sponsorship contract on 10 January 2016.

Teams
A total of 12 teams competed in the 2016 season: 10 sides from the 2015 season and two promoted teams from the 2015 Myanmar National League 2.

Manaw Myay and Nay Pyi Taw were relegated to the 2016 MNL-2 since they finished the 2015 season at the lowest positions. They were replaced by the two promoted teams from the 2015 MNL-2, champions Southern Myanmar and runners-up Horizon.

Stadiums

(*) – not ready to play. MNL clubs that have not had their home stadia ready to host home matches currently use Aung San Stadium and Thuwunna Stadium in Yangon.

Name changes
Kanbawza FC renamed themselves to Shan United FC

Personnel and sponsoring
Note: Flags indicate national team as has been defined under FIFA eligibility rules. Players may hold more than one non-FIFA nationality.

Managerial changes

Foreign players
The number of foreign players is restricted to four per MNL club. A team can use three foreign players on the field in each game, including a slot for a player from among AFC countries.

Result

League table

Result table

Matches

Fixtures and results of the Myanmar National League 2016 season.

Week 1

Week 2

Week 3

Week 4

Week 5

Week 6

Week 7

Week 8

Week 9

Week 10

Week 11

Week 12

Week 13

Week 14

Week 15

Week 16

Week 17

Week 18

Week 19

Week 20

Week 21

Week 22

Top scorers

Clean Sheets

Awards

Monthly awards

See also
2016 MNL-2
2016 General Aung San Shield
2016 MFF Charity Cup
List of Myanmar football transfers summer 2016

References

 Myanmar National League Facebook Official Page

External links
 Myanmar National League Official Website
 Myanmar National League Facebook Official Page

Myanmar National League seasons
Myanmar
2016 in Burmese football